Rose Toll (June 4, 1911 – May 12, 1997) was a former Democratic member of the Pennsylvania House of Representatives.

Toll's husband was U.S. Representative Herman Toll.

References

Democratic Party members of the Pennsylvania House of Representatives
Women state legislators in Pennsylvania
1997 deaths
1911 births
20th-century American politicians
20th-century American women politicians